Westville is a town in Adair County, Oklahoma located in the foothills of the Ozark Mountains. Westville lies at the junction of U.S. Highways 59 and 62, and approximately thirteen miles north of Stilwell, Oklahoma, the county seat.

History
Before statehood, Westville was a community in the Goingsnake District of the Cherokee Nation. The town was founded in 1895, when the Kansas City, Pittsburg and Gulf Railroad (later acquired by the Kansas City Southern Railroad) was constructing a rail line from Kansas City to the Gulf Coast. The Westville post office was established on November 18, 1895. The town name honored Jim West, who lived one mile south of nearby Cincinnati, Arkansas, and whose son, Jim West, Jr., was an attorney for the Kansas City Southern Railway.

The original plat for the included 175 acres. Expansion came soon with the development of the William D Williams addition and the Pat Dore Addition. 

In 1902 a second rail line, the Ozark and Cherokee Central Railway, which ran from Fayetteville, Arkansas to Okmulgee, Oklahoma, began operations through Westville giving the town an enviable position at the rail junction. That line, later owned by St. Louis – San Francisco Railway, discontinued service to Westville in the late 1940's

When Adair County was formed in 1907, Westville was identified as the county seat, due partly to its location at the intersection of two major railroads: the Kansas City Southern Railway and the St. Louis – San Francisco Railway. The county seat was moved to Stilwell in 1910.

Geography
Westville is located at  (35.991414, -94.571088).

Westville is located at the intersection of U.S. Routes 59 and 62.

Demographics

As of the census of 2000, there were 1,596 people, 599 households, and 401 families residing in the town. There were 719 housing units at an average density of 596.5 per square mile (229.4/km2). The racial makeup of the town was 62.41% White, 0.25% African American, 28.07% Native American, 0.31% Asian, 2.63% from other races, and 6.33% from two or more races. Hispanic or Latino of any race were 6.02% of the population.

There were 599 households, out of which 36.1% had children under the age of 18 living with them, 45.9% were married couples living together, 17.5% had a female householder with no husband present, and 32.9% were non-families. 28.7% of all households were made up of individuals, and 12.0% had someone living alone who was 65 years of age or older. The average household size was 2.57 and the average family size was 3.16.

In the town, the population was spread out, with 29.9% under the age of 18, 8.3% from 18 to 24, 25.8% from 25 to 44, 20.3% from 45 to 64, and 15.7% who were 65 years of age or older. The median age was 34 years. For every 100 females, there were 87.1 males. For every 100 females age 18 and over, there were 82.4 males.

The median income for a household in the town was $22,381, and the median income for a family was $28,882. Males had a median income of $25,729 versus $20,438 for females. The per capita income for the town was $11,055. About 16.1% of families and 22.3% of the population were below the poverty line, including 24.0% of those under age 18 and 19.0% of those age 65 or over.

Government 
Westville has a Mayor-Council form of Government, which contains five member on the Town Council. Departments of the Town that report to the Council include the Police Department, Volunteer Fire Department, Office of Emergency Management, Street Department, and Town Clerk's Office. 

Mayor Adam McKenzie was appointed interim Mayor in 2021 when former Mayor Tony Barker stepped down from his position on the Council. After public election in 2022, new council member Chris Null was elected to finish remainder Tony's term. Adam was then confirmed to be the Mayor at the following council meeting.

Town Council Members 

 Mayor, Adam McKenzie
 Vice Mayor, James L. Oliver 
 Councilman, Stefanie Mitchell
 Councilman, Lonnie Coates
 Councilman, Chris Null

Police Department 
Westville Police Department is the primary Law Enforcement and Dispatching agency for the Town of Westville.

Department Head 
Chief of Police, Scott Mitchell

Fire Department 
Westville Fire Department serves the Town of Westville, the surrounding communities, and providing assistance to rural Fire Departments.

Department Head 
Fire Chief, Brett Nickens

Office of Emergency Management 
Westville E.M. works with the community to coordinate and integrate acvtivies necessary to build, sustain, and improve the capability to mitigate against, prepare for, respond to, and recover from threatened or natural disasters, or man-made disasters.

Department Head 
Director, Judy Morris

Street Department 
The Westville Street Department is responsible for maintaining and improving all town streets and properties.

Department Head 
Superintendent, Bradley Sanders

Town Clerk's Office 
Westville Town Clerk Office serves as the official keeper of the municipal records, and as such. Duties also includes presenting the agenda and minutes for the legislative and committee meetings, assembling the agenda packets with supporting documents, etc...

Town Clerk, Deneille Hembree

NRHP Sites

Sites in Westville listed on the National Register of Historic Places include:

 The Buffington Hotel, on Main St.
 The Rev. Jesse Bushyhead Grave, which has a 15-foot-tall (4.6 m) marble monument to the Cherokee religious and political leader, in the Baptist Mission Cemetery off State Highway 59
 The Opera Block (on Main St. but since demolished)
 The Ballard Creek Roadbed (relevant to the Cherokee Trail of Tears, address restricted)
 Breadtown (relevant to the Cherokee Trail of Tears, address restricted)

Notable people
 Jim Ross, World Wrestling Entertainment commentator
 Markwayne Mullin, United States Senator from Oklahoma and former United States House Representative for Oklahoma's Oklahoma's 2nd congressional district

References

Towns in Adair County, Oklahoma
Towns in Oklahoma